Ragnarok is a Norwegian black metal band.  The band was formed in Sarpsborg, Norway in 1994 by Jerv and Jontho, after they left Thoth, their previous band. Lyrical themes include Norse Mythology, Vikings, Satanism, War, and Anti-Christianity. The band's name comes from the Old Norse word Ragnarök, the prophesied last battle between the Norse gods and the giants. They are "one of the most extreme black metal bands in Norway", making heavy use of make-up and special effects.

History
Ragnarok made a name for themselves locally by recording demo tracks and a compilation album including the song "Et Vinterland i Nord" with their original lineup, consisting of Jerv on bass, Jontho on drums, Rym on guitar and Thyme as the vocalist. The band received good feedback for their demo work and soon signed to the cult label Head Not Found Records, who released Ragnarok's debut album Nattferd in 1995.

The band was generally dissatisfied with Head Not Found Records, and intended to leave in 1996, but were persuaded to sign a contract for two more albums after the label offered them a much better deal.  Unfortunately, this deal meant that Ragnarok was forced to turn down a deal with Century Media, who expressed interest in signing the band after a show in Oslo later that same year.

In 1997, work was begun on Ragnarok's second album, titled Arising Realm, which featured Shagrath of the band Dimmu Borgir on keyboards.  In 1998, Ragnarok went on tour for the first time, playing eight shows in Denmark and Germany in addition to the Blood Log Festival in Leipzig.  At the end of the year Ragnarok started recording Diabolical Age, their third album.  Diabolical Age was not finished until late in 1999, and by the time it was actually released Thyme had left the band, to be replaced by vocalist Astaroth, and Sander had joined as a second guitarist.  It was soon clear, however, that Sander was not cut out to perform with the band, so he was kicked out and replaced with Lord Arcamous shortly after the eventual release of Diabolical Age in 2000.

Later in 2000, Ragnarok embarked on a short tour with Swedish band Satanic Slaughter, in the course of which it became clear that Astaroth was not capable of continuing on with the band.  He left the band after the tour. Lord Arcamous filled in as vocalist for the recording of the album In Nomine Satanas on Regain Records, but he himself was replaced with Hoest of the band Taake in 2002.

After Hoest joined the band, Ragnarok toured both Europe and North America and honed their sound for their next album. Blackdoor Miracle was recorded in 2004, and both the band and its fans were pleased with the results.

After a renewal of the lineup the only remaining original member, drummer Jontho, announced they will start touring with the new lineup. The band has rarely played live in recent years but were scheduled for the 10th anniversary of the Inferno Metal Festival in 2010. When they appeared there in 2003, a reviewer from HeavyMetal.no said their performance "fitted very well into [my concept of black metal], both good and bad" and seemed to please large numbers of the crowd. And in December 2005 they played their "first time at a drug-free event" at St. Croix in Fredrikstad and were a huge success.

In March 2010, they released their new album, Collectors of the King, through Regain Records. A reviewer at HeavyMetal.no called it "some of the most insistent and gripping Black Metal I've heard in a while." The reviewer at NecroWeb gave it 7 out of 10 points.

In May 2012, they announced they had signed with Agonia Records and would release a seventh album. Their seventh studio album was released October 31 in Europe and November 6 in North America under the name Malediction.

After vocalist Hans Fryste announced his departure from the band in early 2014, the band finally officially announced their replacement for him September 14, 2014. The new vocalist will be drummer and Ragnarok founder Jontho himself, and his place behind the drum kit on stage will be taken by Dauden drummer Malignant.

On April 29, 2017, former bassist and co-founder Jerv was killed in a car accident.

Current members
Jontho – drums (1994–2014), vocals (2014–present)
Bjarkan – guitar (2020–present)
Ihizahg – guitar (2021–present)
Hellcommander Vargblod – bass (2021–present)

Former members
Thyme – vocals (1994–1999)
Jerv – bass (1994–2007; died 2017)
Rym – guitar (1994–2007)
Astaroth – vocals (2000–2001)
Lord Arcamous – vocals (2001–2002)
Hoest – vocals (2002–2007)
Brigge – guitar (2008–2010)
HansFyrste – vocals (2008–2014)
Decepticon – bass (2008–2016)

Timeline

Discography
 Et Vinterland i Nord demo (1994)
 North Land demo (1995)
 Nattferd (1995)
 Arising Realm (1997)
 Diabolical Age (2000)
 In Nomine Satanas (2002)
 Blackdoor Miracle (2004)
 Collectors of the King (2010)
 Malediction (2012)
 Psychopathology (2016)
 Non Debellicata (2019)

References

External links

Norwegian black metal musical groups
Musical groups established in 1994
1994 establishments in Norway
Musical groups from Sarpsborg